Diaphania oriolalis is a moth in the family Crambidae. It was described by Viette in 1958. It is found on the Comoros, where it has been recorded from Grande Comore.

References

Moths described in 1958
Diaphania